Jesse Rosenfeld (born 17 October 1983) is an Australian stage, television and film actor, best known for playing Marco Silvani on the soap opera Neighbours.

Biography
Jesse was born in Melbourne, Australia, but spent much of his childhood in Cairns.

At the age of twelve, whilst living in Cairns, Jesse landed the role of Danny Tippler in Bruce Beresford's motion picture Paradise Road and found himself spending several months working alongside such actors as Frances McDormand, Glenn Close, Pauline Collins, Pamela Rabe, Elizabeth Spriggs and relative newcomer Cate Blanchett.  His talent and enthusiasm were furthered by his work with these great performers. He returned to Melbourne to complete high school – at Bialik College – and spent a year at the University of Melbourne before his admission to the prestigious Victorian College of the Arts (VCA). He graduated from the VCA in 2005.

Filmography

Television

Theatre

External links 

Jesse Rosenfeld Image Search
AJN Interview with Jesse Rosenfeld
Melbourne's THE AGE Review of Hitchcock & Herrmann]
The Groggy Squirrel Review of Hitchcock & Herrmann 
Melbourne Stage Online Review of Hitchcock & Herrmann

1983 births
Australian male soap opera actors
Australian male film actors
Australian male stage actors
Living people
Male actors from Melbourne